Mercy Health - St. Vincent Medical Center was the first hospital in Toledo, Ohio and is part of Mercy Health Partners. 

Mercy St. Vincent Medical Center (MSVMC), established in 1855, is the critical-care regional referral and teaching center within the Mercy Health Partners system. It is one among a seven hospitals system serving Northwest Ohio and Southeast Michigan.

St. Vincent holds designations for treating high-risk mothers and babies, is a Level I Trauma Center for children & adults, and is an accredited Chest Pain Center.

Through a partnership with University of Toledo Medical Center and St. Rita's Medical Center, the hospital operates both helicopter air-ambulances and ground-based critical care ambulances.

References

External links
St. Vincent Mercy Medical Center
LifeFlight

Hospitals established in 1855
Buildings and structures in Toledo, Ohio
Level 1 trauma centers
Trauma centers